I Want What I Want is a 1972 British drama film directed by John Dexter and starring Anne Heywood, Harry Andrews and Jill Bennett. It is based on the 1966 novel I Want What I Want by Geoff Brown.

Cast
 Anne Heywood as Roy / Wendy
 Harry Andrews as  Roy's Father
 Jill Bennett as Margaret Stevenson
 Paul Rogers as Mr. Waites
 Michael Coles as Frank
 Sheila Reid as June
 Virginia Stride as Shirley
 Jill Melford as	Lorna
 Philip Bond as	Philip
 Rachel Gurney as Mrs. Parkhurst
 Robin Hawdon as Tony
 Anthony Sharp as Mr. Parkhurst

References

External links

1972 films
1972 LGBT-related films
1972 drama films
Transgender-related films
British drama films
Films based on British novels
1970s English-language films
1970s British films